The Mendiola massacre was an incident that took place in Mendiola Street, San Miguel, Manila, Philippines on January 22, 1987, in which state security forces under President Corazon Aquino violently dispersed a farmers' march to Malacañang Palace in protest for the lack of government action on land reform.

Calls for just and comprehensive land reforms to President Aquino were unheeded. The turbulent turn of events sparked rallies and demonstrations taken part by farmers, workers, and students protesting the injustice. According to reports of survivors, riot personnel disguised as civilians opened fire on unarmed protesters killing at least 12 and injuring 51 protesters.

Background
Corazon Aquino's election to the presidency brought about the prospects of rebuilding the formal institutions of democracy and the fundamentals of the Philippine economy. Conflicts with secessionist groups in Mindanao, ballooning national debts, and severe economic inequality plagued the newly-installed administration.

One such severe manifestation of the economic inequality can be seen in the agrarian problems of the Philippines at that time. Promised land reforms during the Marcos regime failed to bring agrarian justice to the farmers. Instead, Marcos' cronies and oligarchs perpetuated the abuse of farmers and peasants. The newly raised administration acted as a fresh opportunity for minorities to supplicate their respective grievances. The farmers pushed the new government amendments in the agrarian law. However, their representatives were told by Minister Heherson Alvarez to wait for the finalization of the new Philippine Constitution and the new Congress, which made the farmers suspicious of this indecisiveness. Furthermore, the new Congress that would supposedly make the laws that will carry out the reforms was dominated by the landlords.

Aquino's EO 229 failed to address the root of agrarian problems of the country, disappointing the farmers and causing them to protest against the administration.

The Kilusang Magbubukid ng Pilipinas (KMP or Peasant Movement of the Philippines), a militant farmers' group led by Jaime Tadeo, demanded genuine agrarian reform from the Aquino government. On January 15 1987, KMP members encamped at the Ministry of Agrarian Reform (now the Department of Agrarian Reform) in Diliman, Quezon City. The group presented their problems and demands: give land for free to farmers, end the retention of lands by landlords, and halt the amortizations of land payments. Dialogue between the farmers, represented by Jaime Tadeo, and the government, represented by Agrarian Reform Minister Heherson Alvarez, took place on January 20, 1987. Alvarez promised to bring the matter to the President's attention during the next day's cabinet meeting.

The response of the administration toward the protests, particularly in the Mendiola incident, was a violent dispersal. Whether or not it was a deliberate action or a miscommunicated order, the Mendiola incident showed that there were people who were dissatisfied with the self-preserving oligarchs-legislators who backed Aquino's administration. The violent dispersal became a tipping point for key anti-government groups such as the National Democratic Front (NDF), the main communist coalition at the time to defer from peace talks with the new government, ending hopes for reconciliation for agrarian reforms.

March to Malacañang
On January 22, 1987, the farmers decided to march to Malacañang Palace in order to air their needs instead of having the chance to negotiate with Heherson Alvarez. Marching from the Quezon Memorial Circle, Tadeo's group was joined by members of other militant groups: Kilusang Mayo Uno (May One Movement), Bagong Alyansang Makabayan (New Patriotic Alliance), League of Filipino Students and Kongreso ng Pagkakaisa ng Maralitang Lungsod (Unity Congress of the Urban Poor). At 1:00 in the afternoon, the marchers reached Liwasang Bonifacio and held a brief presentation. At around the same time, anti-riot personnel under the command of Capital Regional Command commander Gen. Ramon Montaño, Task Force Nazareno under the command of Col. Cesar Nazareno and police forces under the command of Western Police District Chief Brig. Gen. Alfredo Lim were deployed around the vicinity of Malacañang.

The first line of civil disturbance control units consisted of policemen from the Western Police District. About ten yards behind the policemen were Integrated National Police Field Force units. The third line, a further ten yards from the second police line, consisted of a Philippine Marine Corps unit, the Marine Civil Disturbance Control Battalion. Positioned behind the Marines were army trucks, water cannons, fire trucks and two Mobile Dispersal Teams equipped with tear gas delivery gear.

The marchers numbered 10,000–15,000 by the time they reached Recto Avenue. They clashed with the police, and the police lines were breached. At this point, gunshots were fired, signalling the start of the killings, and the activists disengaged from the melee, retreating towards Recto Avenue. Sporadic gunfire increased amidst the withdrawal. Alfredo Lim, mayor of Manila in 2007, conjectures that the Marines were responsible for the shooting.

Aftermath
The Western Police District, Marines, Special Weapons and Tactics team, and Military, all colluded to barricade the entrance of the Malacañang Palace. They formed multiple lines of defense, but could not make the marching rallyists depart. The second line of defense, composed of the Marines, fired warning shots and threw pillbox and tear gas canisters to the supporters which started an even worse commotion. Twelve marchers were immediately confirmed dead. At least fifty people were injured, six of which were policemen; the victims were taken to different hospitals around the area namely: Far Eastern University Hospital, Philippine General Hospital, Jose Reyes Memorial Medical Center, UST Hospital, Mary Chiles Hospital, Singian, and Ospital ng Maynila.

Death toll rose the next day, reaching eighteen deaths. Injury toll also rose to one hundred one people. As a response to the Mendiola massacre, leaders from the Kilusang Magbubukid ng Pilipinas announced that they will be staging a nationwide protest condemning the mass killing. An estimated 750,000 members and another 2,000,000 familiars were expected to join the said protest. As part of the protest, farmers were instructed to go on a farming strike, barricading major produce routes, and forcibly seizing agricultural inputs such as pesticides and fertilizers from abusive landlords. KMP leader Jaime Tadeo also demanded for the immediate resignation of then Defense Minister Rafael Ileto, Gen. Fidel Ramos, Brig. Gen. Ramon Montano, and Brig. Gen. Alfredo Lim for "they were directly involved in the massacre."

Then exiled dictator Ferdinand Marcos released a statement in Honolulu regarding the mass shooting. In his statement, he showed vexation towards the reaction of the armed forces towards the rallyists. He also then said President Aquino had a private militia known as "The Yellow Army” that was responsible for the massacre because of a lack of attention given to the rallyists before their March.

Gen. Ramon Montano said in an interview that the marchers were to blame for the shooting, as they attempted to break the barricade set up by the armed forces. However, he admitted that the military might have "overreacted" on their response to the protesters, ultimately undermining their part in the tragedy.

Following the incident was the February 4, 1987 letter addressed to President Aquino indicating the desires of most of the Filipinos, especially the poor and the oppressed, which is "bringing about a more progressive and stable foundation for upholding their rights." The KMP emphasizes on the incompetence of the Ministry of Agrarian Reform, which was strongly believed to be the primary reason for the massacre. Lastly, the letter demanded the Aquino government to mend its governance and side with the Filipinos, particularly to the peasants, workers, and the poor in place of only the Filipinos associated with the upper class and foreign lands.

The Citizen's Mendiola Commission (CMC), formed by Aquino to investigate on the incident released its official report on the day of February 27, 1987. The commissioners noted that the rallyers did not secure a permit; the members of crowd-disturbance units were armed with pistols and armalites; armed soldiers in civilian clothing were among the crowd; some of the demonstrators carried weapons; and Jaime Tadeo, KMP's leader, uttered words that incited sedition. However, the commission failed to identify who fired on the marchers and recommended further investigation by the National Bureau of Investigation (NBI). Overall, the findings were not conclusive as to who should be held responsible for the killings. On February 28, 1987, upon completion of the investigations regarding the Mendiola massacre, the Citizens Mendiola Commission suggested to President Aquino to file sedition charges to Tadeo.

Immediate consequences of the protest 
In protest over the massacre, the Chairman and Vice-Chairman of the Presidential Committee on Human Rights, Jose Diokno and J.B.L. Reyes, resigned from the government. Moreover, other members of the Presidential Committee on Human Rights asked for the resignation of Defense Minister Ileto and Gen. Fidel V. Ramos for their alleged complicity in the Mendiola massacre.

Crispin Beltran, leader of Kilusang Mayo Uno, spoke on behalf of the protesters when he stated that they wanted no more bloodshed: "We shall return tomorrow with no weapons, but armed with courage and determination to seek justice for our slain comrades." True enough, the number of protesters near the Malacanang Palace increased, from the initial 10,000 to over 15,000 and growing. As a result of the increased dialogue between the government and the rallyists, more protests and the number of protesters increased, and not just at the site of the Mendiola Bridge and the Malacanang Palace. In Pampanga, an estimated 2,000 protesters barricaded highways, including the highway linking Eastern Pampanga and San Fernando, and the highway linking Porac and Angeles City. Talks regarding the agrarian reforms were shortly suspended because both sides failed to reach a common agenda, due to the real threat to the members of both panels at the time (pertaining to the rebels and insurgents against the Aquino administration at the time).

On another note, the National Union of Students of the Philippines (NUSP) challenged President Aquino to sign an executive order carrying out a minimum program of land reform presented to her by the Kilusang Magbubukid. Aside from the challenge of the NUSP, KMP Chairman Jaime Tadeo said that the Aquinos should distribute their 6,000 hectare (14,600 acre) estate in Central Luzon as a model for land reform. In response to this, President Aquino was reportedly prepared to distribute at least parts of Hacienda Luisita, and the Aquino sugar plantation as part of the supposed land reform program, but never did so. In order to improve relations with the protesters, (including the groups Kilusang Magbubukid ng Pilipinas, Kilusang Mayo Uno, the August Twenty-One Movement, and the Bagong Alyansang Makabayan) President Aquino allowed the protesters to cross the Mendiola Bridge and march towards Malacañang Palace.

Government legislation as response
As a response to the incident, in 1987, the Aquino Government at last implemented a Comprehensive Agrarian Reform Program (CARP). It was passed as "an agriculturally-based, economically-driven" reform. This reform applied to all types of agricultural land, both public and private, regardless of tenure arrangement and crops produced. It aimed to redistribute 9,773,870 ha of land to 3,713,110 beneficiaries.

However, CARP experienced slow implementation due to the land evaluation processes of the time, the lack of guidelines for landowner compensation, troubles with landowner-tenant negotiations, and the lack of institutional coordination between agrarian administrative agencies.

Reception of CARP
Because of the problems in the implementation of CARP, public faith in government credibility and its capability to undertake reforms diminished.

The farmers' response to this legislation was also critical. They asserted that the legislation goes against the democratic process of land ownership and protects landlord interests. They also state that, having been passed long after public rage and condemnation followed the government during the Mendiola Massacre, it was passed as a counter-insurgency measure, instead of for genuine social justice.

Eventual consequences
In 1988, the Manila Regional Trial Court issued a decision to dismiss a P6.5-million class suit filed by relatives of the victims. This decision was upheld by the Supreme Court in 1993.

In 2007, members of the Kilusang Magbubukid ng Pilipinas installed a granite marker at the Bantayog ng mga Bayani in Quezon City, commemorating the 20th anniversary of the incident.

The government disallowed the conduct of demonstrations at Mendiola. However, in January 2008, Mayor Alfredo Lim allowed rallies at the landmark, as long as they were held on weekends and holidays.

Reactions

From key political figures 
Jose W. Diokno, the Chairman of the Presidential Committee on Human Rights, now the Commission on Human Rights resigned in disgust, which his daughter national historian Maris Diokno said was the only time he was seen to be "near tears". Atty. Diokno died soon after the event and according to National Artist F. Sionil José, Aquino had blocked all the attending farmers to Diokno's memorial service which made José leave weeping in shock.

In media and the arts 
In late 1990, playwright and filmmaker Lito Tiongson directed a short film on 16 mm titled Isang Munting Lupa that is based on the 1961 short story "Tata Selo" by Roger Sikat but set before and during the Mendiola massacre. It stars Ray Ventura, Beth Mondragon, Joel Lamangan, Rody Vera, Nanding Josef and Bon Vibar.

Gallery

See also
1987 in Philippines
List of massacres in the Philippines
Escalante massacre
1986 EDSA Revolution

References

Further reading

1987 in the Philippines
Agrarian politics
Filmed killings
History of Manila
History of the Philippines (1986–present)
Massacres in the Philippines
Presidency of Corazon Aquino
Protest-related deaths
Political repression in the Philippines